M'Liss is a 1918 American silent comedy drama film directed by Marshall Neilan, written by Frances Marion and based on a Bret Harte story. The film was made previously in 1915 and was remade again in 1922 as The Girl Who Ran Wild, starring Gladys Walton. Another same-titled remake was released in 1936, starring Anne Shirley.

Plot
The film takes place in the mining town of Red Gulch in the High Sierra. M'Liss (Mary Pickford) is one of the inhabitants whose father "Bummer" (Theodore Roberts) lost his fortune in the gold mines. Now his only investment, which pays a dividend, is his chicken Hildegarde. M'Liss regards herself as a crook and robs Yuba Bill's stage coach. Yuba, however, is fascinated by the young lady and does not mind.

M'Liss is the only person in Bummer's life, since his brother Jonathan, a wealthy pioneer, lives in San Francisco. One day, Jonathan turns his face toward the Sunset Trail. Clara Peterson (Winifred Goodwin) has been his nurse for over three years and her brother Jim (Val Paul) finds out they will receive $500 each for their services after his death. He is outraged they will get only that small amount of money.

Charles Gray (Thomas Meighan) is the school teacher who wants M'Liss to go to school as well. M'Liss isn't interested in an education. Charles keeps on pursuing her and she finally decides to go. He demands her to mind her manners when she's at school. She talks back to the boards members and is expelled. Charles, however, is charmed by the brave young girl. That same day, Bummer gets stabbed in the back by an unknown person. The sheriff suspects Charles, since he was the last person to visit Bummer.

When M'Liss is informed, she is crushed. She is invited to visit the murderer in jail and is shocked to find out it's Charles. Three weeks later, a murder trial starts. M'Liss is the only one believing in Charles' innocence. Clara Peterson reaches town to visit Bummer, finding him dead, she declares herself his long lost widow and asserts her claim to the will. M'Liss refuses to believe she is her mother. Finally, Charles is sent to jail for 60 years. M'Liss helps him escape, but the police follow him. M'Liss witnesses them shooting Charles, but does not know they went after the wrong guy and actually shot Jim. Jim and Mexican Joe, with the help of the sheriff, admit they killed Bummer for his will. The fortune now belongs to M’Liss, who reunites with a now free Charles.

Cast
 Mary Pickford as Melissa 'M'liss' Smith
 Theodore Roberts as John Benson "Bummer" Smith
 Thomas Meighan as Charles Gray
 Tully Marshall as Judge Joshua McSnagley
 Charles Ogle as Yuba Bill
 Monte Blue as Mexican Joe Dominguez
 Winifred Greenwood as Clara Peterson
 Helen Kelly as Clytemnestra Veronica McSnagley
 Val Paul as Jim Peterson
 William H. Brown as Sheriff Sandy Waddles
 John Burton as Parson Bean
 Charles A. Post as Butch Saunders
 Guy Oliver as Snakebit Saunders

Reception
Like many American films of the time, M'Liss was subject to cuts by city and state film censorship boards. For example, the Chicago Board of Censors required cuts, in Reel 5, of the intertitle "Say, sheriff, how about a little necktie party" and the scene of the sheriff looking up tree and dropping rope.

References

External links

1918 films
1918 drama films
American black-and-white films
American silent feature films
Remakes of American films
Articles containing video clips
Censored films
Paramount Pictures films
Films with screenplays by Frances Marion
Films directed by Marshall Neilan
1910s American films
Silent American drama films
1910s English-language films